= Swiss Republic =

The Swiss Republic may refer to:

- Switzerland, a country in central Europe, being a federal republic consisting of 26 cantons
- Old Swiss Confederacy (c. 1300–1798), a loose confederation of largely independent small states called cantons, the precursor of modern-day Switzerland
- Helvetic Republic (1798–1803), a constitutional arrangement imposed on the Swiss cantons by French military might
